George and Gladys Scheidemantel House is a historic home located at East Aurora in Erie County, New York.  It is a locally distinctive example of the Arts and Crafts movement style of architecture built in 1910.  It is a two-story, frame, bungalow that combines elements of the American Foursquare and Craftsman styles.  George Scheidemantel was for a time head of the Roycroft Leather Shop and the house designer, William Roth, was head Roycroft carpenter.

The house now serves as The Elbert Hubbard Roycroft Museum. The museum features furniture and decorative items produced by the Roycroft community.

It was listed on the National Register of Historic Places in 1993.

References

External links
 Information about the Elbert Hubbard Roycroft Museum
 Article about the Elbert Hubbard Roycroft Museum
 ScheideMantel House, Buffalo as an Architectural Museum website
 Scheidemantel, George and Gladys, House - U.S. National Register of Historic Places on Waymarking.com

Houses on the National Register of Historic Places in New York (state)
Houses completed in 1910
Arts and Crafts movement
Museums in Erie County, New York
Historic house museums in New York (state)
American Craftsman architecture in New York (state)
Decorative arts museums in the United States
Bungalow architecture in New York (state)
National Register of Historic Places in Erie County, New York